Chapfensee is a reservoir at Mels, Canton of St. Gallen, Switzerland. The area around the reservoir is a nature preserve.

The reservoir was built in 1946/1947 and used to generate power at the plant Plons.

See also
List of mountain lakes of Switzerland

References

External links

Moorlandschaft Chapfen 
EW Mels: Krafwerk Plons 

Lakes of the canton of St. Gallen
Chapfen
RChapfen